Rhosllanerchrugog F.C. were a Welsh football team from the village of Rhosllanerchrugog, Wrexham. In November 2018, it was announced that Ben Barlow, vocalist of the Welsh pop-punk band Neck Deep, had signed for the club. As of September 2018 Manager Jeff Owen and assistant managers Matt Griffiths and Wes Roberts are the current coaching staff. In December 2019 the club resigned from the league, effectively merging with Johnstown Youth.

League history
Rhos were founding members of the Welsh Senior League, one of the first organised football leagues in Wales.

Cup history
The club played in the English FA Cup for three seasons during the nineteenth century.

Former players
Went on to or previously played Professional or International football

  Abel Hughes
  Joseph Owens
  Seth Powell
  Robert Roberts

2017 revival
The Rhosllanerchrugog name was revived more than 100 years after they last played, when in June 2017 the name was listed among the entrants for the 2017–18 North East Wales Football League season.

References

Defunct football clubs in Wales
Football clubs in Wales
Football clubs in Wrexham
Sport in Wrexham County Borough
Clwyd East Football League clubs